Kuřimské Jestřabí is a municipality and village in Brno-Country District in the South Moravian Region of the Czech Republic. It has about 200 inhabitants.

Administrative parts
The hamlet of Blahoňov is an administrative part of Kuřimské Jestřabí.

References

Villages in Brno-Country District